Ruhaizad Ismail is a Singapore international football player who plays for Tanah Merah United.

Club career
Previously he played for SAFFC, Young Lions and Gombak United.

International career
Ismail has played twice for the Singapore national team.

Honours
Balestier Khalsa
 Singapore Cup: 2014
 League Cup: 2013

External links

References

Singaporean footballers
Singapore international footballers
Living people
1982 births
Warriors FC players
Balestier Khalsa FC players
Gombak United FC players
Singapore Premier League players
Young Lions FC players
Association football midfielders